Police General Chitchai Wannasathit (born 13 August 1946 in Ubon Ratchathani Province) was the caretaker prime minister of Thailand from April to May 2006, when Thaksin Shinawatra took a break from his duties as prime minister following a disappointing showing in elections. Thaksin returned to his duties after more than a month. Chitchai Wannasathit was simultaneously the first deputy prime minister and justice minister. On 19 September 2006, he was arrested by the Thai military during the 2006 coup d'état, but was soon released.

Education 
 Amnuay Silpa School
 Royal Thai Police Cadet Academy
 National Defence College of Thailand

Personal life
He was of Chinese descent.

References

1946 births
Chitchai Wannasathit
Living people
Chitchai Wannasathit
Chitchai Wannasathit
Chitchai Wannasathit
Chitchai Wannasathit
Chitchai Wannasathit
Chitchai Wannasathit